This page is intended to be a list of rock textural and morphological terms.

A 
 Adcumulate
 Agglomeritic
 Adamantine a type of lustre
 Amygdaloidal
 Anhedral
 Antitaxial veins
 Aphanitic
 Aplitic; aplite
 Augen textured gneiss
 Axiolitic texture

B 
 Botryoidal
 Brecciated
 Bedding fissile; bedding fissility
 Boudinage; boudins

C 
 Cataclastic
 Chilled margin
 Clastic; see also breccia 
 Cleaved
 Crenulated
 Cross-bedding
 Cross-stratification; also trough-cross stratification.
 Cumulate; see also layered intrusion

D 
 Decussate
 Devitirification; devitrified
 Dendritic texture; dendrites
 Diatextite; see also schlieren and migmatite

E 
 Embayed minerals; see igneous texture
 Equigranular
 Euhedral
 Eutaxitic
 Epiclastic

F 
 Fiamme
 Foliation
 Fissile; see also Bedding fissility.
 Fossiliferous

G 
 Glomeroporphyritic
 Gneissose; gneissic
 Granoblastic 
 Granophyric
 Granulitic
 Graphic

H 
 Holocrystalline 
 Hyaline texture
 Hyalopilitic

I 
 Imbricate
 Intergrowth texture

J 
 Jointed

K 
 Kelyphitic

L 
 Lepidoblastic
 Leucocratic
 Lineation, lineated
 L-tectonite

M 
 Melanocratic
 Mesocratic
 Mesocumulate
 Mylonitic

N 
 Nematoblastic

O 
 Ocelli
 Oolitic; see also limestone 
 Ophitic texture
 Orbicular texture
 Orthocumulate

P 
 Panidiomorphic
 Pegmatitic
 Peloidal
 Perthitic
 Phaneritic
 Phyllitic
 Pisolitic
 Poikilitic
 Poikiloblastic
 Porphyroclastic
 Porphyroblastic
 Porphyritic texture; see also porphyry
 Ptygmatic (folding); see migmatite

Q 
 Quench textures; see obsidian, tachylyte or aphanitic

R 
 Rapakivi texture

S 
 Sandy
 Schistose; schistosity
 Seriate texture
 Shear; sheared; shear fabric
 Slaty; slaty cleavage
 Specular
 Spherulite
 Spinifex texture; see also komatiite
 S-tectonite
 Stratabound
 Stratum
 Stromatolitic
 Stylolitic
 Subhedral
 Symplectite

T 
 Tuffaceous
 Trachytic texture

U

V 
 Vesicular texture
 Variolitic
 Vitreous 
 Vuggy

W - Z

See also 

 Crystallography
 Fracture (geology)
 Fracture (mineralogy)
 List of minerals
 List of rock types
 Rock microstructure

Mineralogy
Petrology
Rock textures